Sandy Creek is an  creek located entirely within Monroe County in the U.S. state of Michigan.   The creek rises in London Township in the north-central portion of the county and flows southeast into Lake Erie in Frenchtown Charter Township at Sterling State Park.

Along the banks of Sandy Creek was one of the earliest French settlements in the area, known as the Sandy Creek Settlement, which existed from approximately 1780–1813 before being abandoned after the Battle of Frenchtown during the War of 1812.

Geography
A very narrow and shallow creek, Sandy Creek contains no dams and is not navigable.  However, the creek's watershed serves an important purpose of flood prevention in the area, which has a relatively flat topography and heavy agricultural use.  In 2019, most of the creek underwent a $1.2 million clearcutting project along its banks to increase the creek's drainage to alleviate flooding along its route.  Sandy Creek's watershed includes portions of Frenchtown Charter Township, Raisinville Township, Exeter Township (including the village of Maybee), London Township, Dundee Township, and the city of Monroe.

Stone embankments and a pump station were built along the banks of Detroit Beach to alleviate flooding from Sandy Creek and potentially rising waters from Lake Erie.

Its only sizable tributary, Little Sandy Creek, flows parallel to the main branch about one mile to the south.  Sandy Creek travels under Interstate 75, U.S. Route 24 (North Telegraph Road), and North Monroe Street (M-125).

The creek contains no large fish populations, and most fish can be found in the artificially enlarged lagoons of Sterling State Park leading to Lake Erie.  Common fish in this area include perch, walleye, crappie, channel and bullhead catfish, largemouth and white bass, carp, northern pike and bluegill.

Sandy Creek Settlement

Along the banks of Sandy Creek near Lake Erie was one of the earliest European settlements in the area, known as the Sandy Creek Settlement.  The small settlement was founded as early as 1780 by the French shortly before the much larger Frenchtown settlement, which was founded in 1784 just south near the River Raisin.  At the time, the area was under the administration of the British Province of Quebec and predated American territorial control.  In 1787, the area became part of the newly established American Northwest Territory, then briefly into the Indiana Territory in 1800, and finally into the Michigan Territory in 1805.

The Sandy Creek Settlement was a small area of land given to the early French settlers by the indigenous Potawatomi tribe, which occupied the area beforehand.  The small settlement of Sandy Creek, which grew to only a few dozen inhabitants, was abandoned in 1813 after the American's suffered a catastrophic defeat at the Battle of Frenchtown during the War of 1812.  During the battle, the Sandy Creek Settlement was abandoned and never resettled.

While parts of Frenchtown later became incorporated into the city of Monroe, there are no remaining traces of the Sandy Creek Settlement.  The Sandy Creek Settlement is listed as part of the River Raisin Heritage Corridor as a contributing element of the River Raisin National Battlefield Park.  The settlement's history is detailed on a historic marker erected by the Monroe County Historical Commission near the boat launch in Sterling State Park.  The historic marker reads:

Joseph Porlier Benec, Sandy Creek's first settler, was granted a tract of land here by the Pottawatomie Indians, August 3, 1780. By the time of the War of 1812, sixteen homes lined the banks of the creek. Retreating Indians swept through the settlement after the defeat of the British and Indians at the first Battle of the River Raisin, January 18, 1813.  Angered by the pro-American remarks of Jean Solo and Rene LaBeau, these Indians shot them. LaBeau's frightened young children ran two and a half miles to the River Raisin, seeking the protection of the American Army. The Americans ordered the Sandy Creek settlement abandoned and it never completely rebuilt.

References

Rivers of Monroe County, Michigan
Rivers of Michigan
Tributaries of Lake Erie